Neofreocorus novaki is a species of beetle in the family Cerambycidae, and the only species in the genus Neofreocorus. It was described by Téocchi in 1988.

References

Crossotini
Beetles described in 1988
Monotypic beetle genera